State Route 162 (SR 162) is a state highway in the U.S. state of California that runs roughly west–east through the Coast Ranges and the Sacramento Valley to the western slopes of the Sierra Nevada. It begins at U.S. Route 101 near Longvale, in Mendocino County, and ends at Brush Creek, in Butte County. For most of its length, it is a two lane, undivided highway. SR 162 is not signed as a contiguous route through Mendocino National Forest in Mendocino and Glenn counties. Instead, the portion inside the national forest is federally maintained by the U.S. Forest Service as Forest Highway 7 (FH 7), and is not included in the state route logs.

Route description
It goes east through Long Valley next to the Middle Fork of the Eel River. On the opposite bank of the river is the right of way of the disused Northwestern Pacific Railroad. This portion of SR 162 is called Covelo Road. Covelo is in Round Valley, home of the Round Valley Indian Reservation. SR 162 is called Covelo Road, Commercial Street, and/or Mina Road as it goes north through the center of town.

When entering the national forest the road becomes Forest Highway 7 (FH 7). The highest point on the road is just north of Black Butte and about  NW of Copper City. It is roughly  along the unpaved road to Alder Springs, which is inside the Mendocino National Forest in Glenn County. Alder Springs is the location of the Alder Springs GASB site, which is part of the Consolidated Reporting of Earthquakes and Tsunamis (CREST) network run by the National Oceanic and Atmospheric Administration (NOAA), the United States Geological Survey (USGS), and the Federal Emergency Management Agency (FEMA). Along the way, SR 162 crosses Stoney Creek and runs east paralleling Nye Creek. Seven miles west of Willows is Thunderhill Raceway Park. At Willows, SR 162 passes the Willows-Glenn County Airport and crosses Interstate 5.

The track of SR 162 turns right and follows State Route 45 south for  along the bank of the Sacramento River to Codora. The highway then turns left going east, crosses the Sacramento River and enters the town of Butte City. The highway jogs north as it passes through Butte City, then east again going  due east to meet State Route 99 (formerly U.S. Route 99). This section is called the Butte City Highway. SR 162 turns north along SR 99 then east again as Oroville Dam Boulevard.

Travelling east, SR 162 passes the Thermalito Afterbay and the Oroville Municipal Airport, before crossing the Feather River on the Randy Jennings Memorial Bridge. As the highway enters Oroville, it crosses under State Route 70. This section is named Oroville Dam Blvd or "Oro-Dam". SR 162 goes  through the center of Oroville then turns right onto Olive Highway. Olive Highway goes east  to Kelly Ridge Road where it turns north and crosses Lake Oroville over the Bidwell Bar Bridge. SR 162 ends along the Oroville-Quincy Highway at Foreman Creek Road along the eastern edge of the Lake Oroville National Recreation Area.

The Oroville-Quincy Highway begins in Oroville at Oro-Dam Blvd E just past Olive Highway and runs east. It continues east roughly paralleling Olive Highway until it merges with SR 162 just before Oakvale Ave. It breaks off from SR 162 at Wally B Lane running parallel to the highway for a mile or so before reconnecting at Kelly Ridge Road. The highway runs roughly north and crosses Lake Oroville over the Bidwell Bar Bridge. SR 162 ends near here at Foreman Creek Road, but the Oroville-Quincy Highway continues toward Berry Creek and Madrone Lake. Here it turns east again and runs  to Brush Creek. Here the highway turns ENE  to Buck's Lodge and Bucks Lake.

SR 162 is part of the California Freeway and Expressway System, and east of State Route 70 in Oroville is part of the National Highway System, a network of highways that are considered essential to the country's economy, defense, and mobility by the Federal Highway Administration.

History
In 1915, the Oroville-Quincy Highway was designated as Legislative Route Number 30. This route was abandoned by the state in 1924. In the late 1930s, there was a temporary routing of Alternate US 40 that ran from Davis through Yuba City to Oroville thence to Quincy along Oroville-Quincy Highway, and Bucks Lake Road.

From 1965 to 1972, the segment from US 101 to Interstate 5 was defined as route 261.

Major intersections

See also

References

External links

Route 162 @ California Highways.com
Caltrans: Route 162 highway conditions
California @ AARoads.com - State Route 162

162
State Route 162
State Route 162
State Route 162
Mendocino National Forest
Willows, California
Oroville, California
Forest Highways in the United States